The State Comptroller is the chief fiscal guardian of the State of Connecticut. The duties and responsibilities of the state comptroller include, among other things, overseeing state accounting, preparing state financial reports, paying and administering benefits to state employees, settling demands against the state that do not first have to be approved or adjusted by the General Assembly, administering miscellaneous appropriations for employee taxes, insurance, and health services, and administering grants to police, firefighters, and municipalities.

Comptrollers in Connecticut are elected to a term of four years, their election taking place in the same cycle as gubernatorial elections.

The current state comptroller is Sean Scanlon, a Democrat who has served since January 4, 2023.

List of comptrollers

Town listed is town of residence at time of election.
 1 Died in office May 15, 1946, and Raymond S. Thatcher was appointed by the General Assembly to fill the vacancy.
 2 Resigned July 19, 1966, to become a member of the Public Utilities Commission.
 3 Appointed by governor July 19, 1966, to fill the unexpired term of Raymond S. Thatcher.
 4 Resigned December 31, 2021, due to ill health.
 5 Appointed by governor December 31, 2021, to fill the unexpired term of Kevin Lembo.

Notes

External links
Official website
Connecticut Comptrollers

 
Connecticut